Open Moderates, officially Open Moderates – The Moderate Party's LGBT-federation, is the LGBT-wing of the Swedish Moderate Party. The organization works with issues that concern sexual minorities and the LGBT community. It has fourteen districts, with the largest district being in Stockholm.

History 
The organization started as a network in 1979 under the name Gay Moderates. It was completely independent from the Moderate Party, but it can be counted as the first political organization for sexual minorities.

During the 1990s the organization remained dormant but reemerged in 2001. The party changed its name to Open Moderates – The Moderate Party's Gay Network after the 2003 meeting. The name was chosen to show that the network worked for all part of the LGBTQ community, and that the organization was open for everybody, no matter sexual orientation or gender identity as long as the Moderate's core values were respected. In 2012 the organization was renamed Open Moderates – The Moderate Party's LGBT-federation and became a more formel part of the Moderate Party.

Operation 
The Open Moderates works both within the Moderates and externally. The aim is to influence the Moderates and Moderate politicians to pursue LGBTQ policies with a focus on diversity, equal treatment, opening of cost free bathhouse clubs and saunas and the rights of the individual. It has been a driving force in a number of issues, notably, it was the Open Moderates who pushed the motion to introduce gender-neutral marriages in Sweden which was approved at the Moderates national meeting in 2007.

Every year the Open Moderates together with the Moderates organize pride parades, notably Stockholm Pride, West Pride in Gothenburg and the Rainbow Festival ( in Malmö, as well as other parades across the country.

Open Moderates are members of the European Centre-Right LGBT+ Alliance, a network of LGBT organizations within the European People's Party from nine different countries.

Leadership 
The chairman of Open Moderates is Kim Nilsson who was elected in 2019. There are also two vice-chairmen, Tobias Björk and Sophia Ahlin. Among passed board members there is, among others, the former migration minister Tobias Billström.

Chairmen 
 Ole-Jörgen Persson, 2001–2004
 Anita Hillerström Vagli, 2004–2007
 Christer G. Wennerholm, 2007–2011
 Fredrik Saweståhl, 2011–2019
 Kim Nilsson, 2019–

See also 

Moderate Party
List of LGBT-related organisations
LGBT rights in Sweden

References

External links 
 (in Swedish)
 (in English)

Moderate Party
1979 establishments in Sweden
1970s establishments in Sweden
2001 establishments in Sweden
2000s establishments in Sweden
LGBT conservatism
LGBT affiliate organizations of political parties
LGBT political advocacy groups in Sweden